Wang Peng is the name of:

Wang Peng (footballer, born 1978), Chinese association footballer
Wang Peng (footballer, born 1991), Chinese association footballer
Wang Peng (footballer, born 1993), Chinese association footballer
Wang Peng (footballer, born 1997), Chinese association footballer
Wang Peng (lieutenant general), Chinese lieutenant general

See also
Wan Peng, Chinese actress